Shakib Arslan (25 December 1869 – 9 December 1946) was Druze prince (amir) in Lebanon who was known as  (Arabic for "Prince of Eloquence") because in addition to being a politician, he was also an influential writer, poet and historian. A prolific author, he penned some 20 books and 2000 articles, to which can be added two collections of poetry and a "prodigious correspondence."

Influenced by the ideas of al-Afghani and Muhammad Abduh, Arslan became a strong supporter of the Pan-Islamic policies of Abdul Hamid II. An Arab nationalist, Arslan was an advocate for pan-Maghrebism (the unification of Algeria, Tunisia, and Morocco). He also advocated the proposition that the survival of the Ottoman Empire was the only guarantee against the division of the ummah and its occupation by the European imperial powers. To Arslan, Ottomanism and Islam were closely bound together and the reform of Islam would naturally lead to the revival of the Ottoman Empire.

Exiled from his homeland by the French Mandate authorities, Arslan passed most of the interwar years in Geneva serving as the unofficial representative of Syria and Palestine at the League of Nations and writing a constant stream of articles for the periodical press of the Arab countries. He was also one of the contributors of Barid Al Sharq, a propaganda newspaper published in Berlin, Nazi Germany.

Advocacy
Amir Shakib advocated a version of Islam that was charged with political and moral assertiveness. He sought to reconstruct the bonds of Islamic solidarity by reminding Muslims from Morocco to Iraq that despite their diversity, they were united by virtue of their common adherence to Islam; if they would but recognize this bond and act on it, he believed they would achieve liberation from their current oppression and the restoration of what he saw as their splendid past. Arslan's work inspired anti-imperialistic propaganda campaigns, much to the irritation of British and French authorities in the Arab world.

He defended Islam as an essential component of social morality. His message, with its call to action and its defense of traditional values at a time of great uncertainty, was well received and attracted widespread attention during the 1920s and 1930s. It was during this time that he wrote his most famous work, Our Decline: Its Causes and Remedies, which described what Arslan believed to be the reasons for the weakness of existing Muslim governments.

He contributed to Muhib Al Din Al Khatib's Cairo-based magazine Al Fath, a Salafi modernist publication.

Personal life
Born into a Druze family, he always tried to link the faith with mainstream Islam, but himself converted to Sunni Islam, "establishing himself as an orthodox Muslim serving the interests of Sunni Islam."

He married Suleima Alkhas Hatog, a Jordanian of Circassian descent, who bore him one son, Ghalib (born 1917) in Lebanon, and two daughters, May (1928–2013)) and Nazima (born 1930) in Switzerland. His daughter, May, married Lebanese Druze politician Kamal Jumblatt and he is the grandfather through her of Lebanese politician Walid Jumblatt.

Arslan died on 9 December 1946, three months after he came back to Lebanon.

Works
Our Decline: Its Causes and Remedies (English translation published by Islamic Book Trust in 2004)

Further reading
Islam Against the West: Shakib Arslan and the Campaign for Islamic Nationalism by William L. Cleveland (University of Texas Press, 2011)
Muslime im Zwischenkriegseuropa und die Dekonstruktion der Faszination vom Westen. Eine kritische Auseinandersetzung mit Šakīb ʾArslāns Artikeln in der ägyptischen Zeitschrift al-Fatḥ (1926-1935) by Mehdi Sajid (EB-Verlag, 2015)

See also
List of political families
Lakhmids

References

External links

Emir Shakib Arslan biography by Hassan Shami at Aide Sanitaire Suisse Aux Palestiniens
The Arab Nation of Shakib Arslan, a review of Islam Against the West, by Martin Kramer
 Swiss Exile: The European Muslim Congress, 1935 (an event organized by Arslan), a chapter from Islam Assembled: The Advent of the Muslim Congresses (New York: Columbia University Press, 1986) by Martin Kramer
 Rabah, Makram: Arslān, Shakīb, Amīr, in: 1914-1918-online. International Encyclopedia of the First World War.

1869 births
1946 deaths
People from Aley District
Shakib
Lebanese Druze
Lebanese princes
Lebanese politicians
Lebanese expatriates in Switzerland
League of Nations people
Lebanese exiles
Lebanese political philosophers
Ottoman Arabic poets
Converts to Islam from Druzism